Pneumocytic hyperplasia is an hyperplasia of pneumocytes lining pulmonary alveoli.

Types 
Pulmonary atypical adenomatous hyperplasia
Multifocal micronodular pneumocyte hyperplasia

References

Pulmonary lesion